
Gmina Perzów is a rural gmina (administrative district) in Kępno County, Greater Poland Voivodeship, in west-central Poland.

Villages
Gmina Perzów contains the villages and settlements of Brzezie, Domasłów, Koza Wielka, Miechów, Perzów, Słupia pod Bralinem, Trębaczów, Turkowy and Zbyczyna.

Neighbouring gminas
Gmina Perzów is bordered by the gminas of Bralin, Dziadowa Kłoda, Kobyla Góra, Namysłów, Rychtal and Syców.

References
Polish official population figures 2006

Perzow
Kępno County